Clarrie is a masculine given name, a diminutive form of Clarence. It may refer to:

Sports
 Clarrie Answerth (1901–1981), Australian rules footballer
 Clarrie Bacon (1889–1954), English footballer
 Clarrie Calwell (1896–1975), Australian rules footballer
 Clarrie Clowe (1893–1980), Australian rules footballer
 Clarrie Curyer (1912–2003), Australian rules footballer
 Clarrie Dall (1887–1953), Australian rules footballer
 Clarrie Fahy (1898–1963), Australian rugby league administrator
 Clarrie Featherston (1892–1964), Australian rules footballer
 Clarrie Fleay (1886–1955), Australian cricketer
 Clarrie Gordon (1917–1983), New Zealand boxer
 Clarrie Grimmett (1891–1980), New Zealand cricketer
 Clarrie Hall (1890–1976), Australian rules footballer
 Clarrie Heard (1906–1990), New Zealand swimmer
 Clarrie Hearn (1905–1981), Australian rules footballer
 Clarrie Hindson (1907–2002), Australian rules footballer
 Clarrie Horder (1890–1960), Australian rugby league player
 Clarrie Ives (1890–1956), Australian rugby league footballer
 Clarrie Jeffreys (1932–2020), Australian rugby league footballer
 Clarrie Jordan (1922–1992), English footballer
 Clarrie Jordon (1909–1965), Australian rules footballer
 Clarrie Kemp (1913–1943), Australian rugby league footballer
 Clarrie Lane (born 1934), former Australian rules footballer
 Clarrie Lethlean (1900–1969), Australian rules footballer
 Clarrie Lonsdale (1906–1971), Australian rules footballer
 Clarrie Morelli (1906–1997), Australian rules footballer
 Clarrie Nolan (1904–1998), Australian rules footballer
 Clarrie O'Connor (1909–1969), Australian rules footballer
 Clarrie Polson, New Zealand rugby league player
 Clarrie Prentice (1891–1948), Australian rugby union and rugby league footballer 
 Clarrie Riordan (1917–1995), Australian rules footballer
 Clarrie Roberts (1888–1966), Australian rules footballer
 Clarrie Scrutton (1899–1982), Australian rules footballer
 Clarrie Semmel (1910–2000), Australian rules footballer
 Clarrie Sherry (1895–1977), Australian rules footballer
 Clarrie Shields (1914–1998), Australian rules footballer
 Clarrie Stevenson (1910–1984), Australian rugby league footballer
 Clarrie Sullivan (1898–1978), Australian rules footballer
 Clarrie Swenson (1923–2003), Australian rules footballer
 Clarrie Tolson (1911–1989), Australian rules footballer
 Clarrie Tye (1892–1936), Australian rugby league player
 Clarrie Uren (1900–1968), Australian rules footballer
 Clarrie Vontom (1914–2000), Australian rules footballer
 Clarrie Wallach (1889–1918), Australian representative rugby union player and World War I officer
 Clarrie White (1914–1991), Australian rules footballer
 Clarrie Williams (1933–2017), English football goalkeeper
 Clarrie Woodfield (1901–1968), Australian rules footballer
 Clarrie Wyatt (1904–1986), Australian rules footballer

Other
 Clarrie Earl (1913–1998), Australian politician
 Clarrie Harders (1915–1997), Australian public servant
 Clarrie Hermes (1921–1991), Australian barrister and magistrate
 Clarrie Isaacs (1948–2003), Australian Aboriginal activist
 Clarrie MacKinnon (born 1945/6), Canadian former politician
 Clarrie Martin (1900–1953), Australian politician
 Clarrie McCue (1927–1992), Australian meteorologist
 Clarrie Millar (1925–2017), Australian politician
 Clarrie O'Shea (1906–1988), Australian trade unionist
 Clarrie Robertson (1902–1974), Australian politician

See also
 Reginald Clarry (1882–1945), British politician
 Clary (disambiguation)

English-language masculine given names
Hypocorisms